KSCB (1270 AM, "Talkradio 1270am") is a radio station broadcasting a news/talk/information format. Licensed to Liberal, Kansas, United States, the station serves the Southwest Kansas area. The station is currently owned by Seward County Broadcasting Co., Inc. and features programming from Premiere Radio Networks and USA Radio Network.

History
KSCB began broadcasting July 25, 1948, on 1270 kHz with 1 KW power (daytime only). It was licensed to Seward County Broadcasting Company, which was owned by former Kansas Governor Alf Landon and others.

References

External links
 

SCB
News and talk radio stations in the United States
Liberal, Kansas
Radio stations established in 1995